Tetragonoderus viridis is a species of beetle in the family Carabidae. It was described by Pierre François Marie Auguste Dejean in 1831.

References

Beetles described in 1831
viridicollis